Hypocrella is a genus of fungi in the family Clavicipitaceae.

Species
The Catalogue of Life lists:
 Hypocrella discoidea (Berk. & Broome) Sacc., 1878 (type sp.)
 Hypocrella duplex
 Hypocrella turbinata

References

External links
 
 

Clavicipitaceae
Hypocreales genera